The Medal of Merit of the Autonomous Region of Madeira is the highest honour given by the autonomous region. The medal is awarded by the Legislative Assembly of Madeira to 'natural or legal entities, public or private, national or foreign, living or posthumously, who have rendered outstanding services to the Region or who, for any other reason, the Region understands that must  be distinguish ”.

The honour was created by Regional Decree n. 3/79/M, signed on January 30 and published on March 24, 1979.

The decision of the attribution is made by the Standing Committee of the Assembly, having received a proposal «of any of the sovereign organs of the Republic, of the Regional Government or of any member of the Legislative Assembly» and taking the opinion of the President of the Regional Government or of a Regional Secretary and of other entities in the area concerned. At the request of any Member, an vote may be taken in the plenary of the Assembly.

The honour is presented by the President of the Legislative Assembly, in a solemn act defined by the Permanent Commission.

The medal model must comply with the following requirements defined by law: be made of silver, have a silver filigree cord and bear, on its reverse, the cross of the Order of Christ (present on the flag and coat of arms of Madeira) and the sayings 'Autonomous Region of Madeira' and 'Portuguese Republic'.

Receivers 
To date, the medal has only been awarded to five personalities, four of them Madeirans (Ornelas Camacho, Rodrigues, Jardim and Ronaldo) and two continental ones (Sá Carneiro and Bishop Santana).

References 

Orders, decorations, and medals of Portugal
Madeira Island
Awards established in 1979
1979 establishments in Portugal